Siddhartha Medical College is a medical school in Vijayawada, Andhra Pradesh. It provides undergraduate and graduate medical education in AP. It is located in Gunadala, Vijayawada, Andhra Pradesh.

History

Siddhartha Medical College was established by Siddhartha Academy of General and Technical Education, Vijayawada-10 in November 1980 with an annual intake of 100 students. As this is a statewide college admissions will be done following six-point formula. Then the Hon'be Chief Minister of Andhra Pradesh late Sri. T. Anjaiah inaugurated the college on 13 March 1981 and the regular session started from 16 March 1981.

A building complex for Siddhartha Medical College was completed in November 1985 with a floor space of 1,48,000 square feet in an area of 57 acres, and the college was shifted into this new premises on 7 November 1985.

The A. P. University of  Health Sciences was established  on November'1 1986 in Vijayawada by the Government of Andhra Pradesh. Siddhartha Medical College was handed over by the Siddhartha Academy of General & Technical Education to the A. P. University of  Health Sciences on 21 December 1986.  The Government of Andhra Pradesh has declined the college from NTR University of Health Sciences on 21 December 2000, and brought this college under the administrative control of Director of Medical Education. According to the Medical Council of India was again re-linked with NTR University of Health Sciences.

Teaching hospitals

Siddhartha Medical College is attached with the following Government Teaching Hospitals in Vijayawada. The students rotate in the departments of the teaching hospitals as per their education requirements.

 Government General Hospital(HGH), Vijayawada:  It was inaugurated by Hon'bee minister Rajah of Palatal, Chief xx at Old city near railway station, later moved to with its branch at Gonadal, Vijayawada. It is a 412-bed, multi-specialty public hospital run by AP state government. It is a teaching facility for Siddhartha Medical College/NTR University of health science's medical students, residents and nurses. It is situated in the heart of Vijayawada metro next to NTR university and Siddhartha Medical College. It provides care in primary care outpatient visits as well as inpatients. The specialities include internal medicine, general surgery, obstetrics and gynecology, pediatrics, neonatal intensive care unit, acute medical care unit, cardiology, nephrology, gastroenterology, neurology, endocrinology and diabetic care. The hospital runs by AP State Government under Directorate of Medical Education. The services are free regardless of income, insurance status, race, sex and country of origin.
 Mangalagiri General Hospital: It is a 180-bed rural hospital serving Mangalagiri and surrounding villages.
 Mangalagiri TB Sanitarium: It is a 30-bed hospital, located near Mangalagiri reserve forest area away from public housing  specially dedicated to tuberculosis treatment. It was founded by state government in 1959 and became a part of teaching facility under Siddhartha Medical College in 1983.

Departments

Siddhartha Medical College has many departments in both preclinical, para clinical and clinical subjects. It has extensive library and laboratories in each department.

Pro Clinical:
 Anatomy
 Physiology
 Bio chemistry

Para Clinical:
 Pharmacology
 Microbiology
 Pathology
 Forensic Medicine

Clinical:
 General Medicine
 General Surgery
 Pediatrics
 Gynecology and Obstetrics
 Orthopedics
 Pulmonary Medicine
 Social and Preventive Medicine
 LENT
 Ophthalmology
 Anesthesia
 Neurosurgery
 Plastic Surgery
 Emergency Medicine
 Dermatology and Meteorology
 Trauma Care
 Psychiatry 
 Gastroenterology
 Cardiology

Notable alumni
Raghu Ram Pillarisetti

Notes

References
 wikimapia.org Siddhartha Medical College and General Hospital
 minglebox.com Siddhartha Medical College, Vijayawada
 studyguideindia.com Siddhartha Medical College, Vijayawada
 indiacollegeshub.com Siddhartha Medical College, Vijayawada
The Hindu (29 July 2007). “Vijayawada loses out to Mangalagiri?”
The Hindu (19 January 2006). “All for a life beyond death”.
Times of India  (23 July 202). “Medical education units to train rural doctors”

External links
 

1980 establishments in Andhra Pradesh
Educational institutions established in 1980
Medical colleges in Andhra Pradesh
Universities and colleges in Vijayawada